Bedrooms and Hallways is a 1998 comedy-drama film about homosexuality. It was written by Robert Farrar and directed by Rose Troche, starring Kevin McKidd, James Purefoy, Tom Hollander, Julie Graham, Simon Callow and Hugo Weaving.

Plot
Leo, an openly gay man celebrates his 30th birthday, and arrives home and is very unhappy to find a surprise-party organised by his roommates Darren and Angie in full swing. Leo has a complicated personal history with some of the guests and hides in his bedroom, feeling grumpy and old. This history is explained in an extended flashback.

It turns out that his brother Adam had encouraged Leo to attend his weekly men's group run by New Age-type goofball Keith whose wife is Sybil. There, Leo meets hunky Irishman Brendan whom he develops a crush on, which he reluctantly reveals to the group. However Brendan is straight and lives with his ex-girlfriend Sally who is later revealed to be Leo's high school sweetheart. A series of 'Iron John' group exercises leads Brendan and Leo to develop a friendship. As they bond, it becomes clear that Brendan's curiosity towards Leo starts to grow in a sexual escalade. In the men's group, one of the other groupsmen become very jealous of Leo's "friendship" with Brendan and that he does not have that with Leo. Brendan fights with the lad over Leo. The friendship is soon to become more, as Brendan appears unexpectedly late one night at Leo's door and sleeps with him; after which they become something of a couple, to the consternation of one man in their men's group, though it encourages another, Terry, to explore his sexuality.

Meanwhile, flamboyant Darren has met real estate agent Jeremy, who gets a kick out of having sex in houses for sale he has been given the keys to. However, he is not interested in "couply" things, despite Darren's attempts. Eventually this leads to their having sex with handcuffs and blindfolds in the bedroom of the house which Sally has on the market, during which she unexpectedly returns home. Jeremy abandons Darren, who dumps him. Leo gets close once more to Sally, and ends up kissing her. Feeling guilty, he leaves in a panic, and ends up telling Brendan what happened, who goes ballistic as he still has feelings for Sally. Leo finds himself in a quandary, and decides to confess to Sally that he is the one who is seeing Brendan (Sally had previously believed it was Leo's roommate Angie). He inadvertently does so while Brendan is there too, and leaves Brendan to face Sally.

Returns to the party, Brendan and Terry get into an argument over Leo and take it outside, where Brendan punches Terry on the nose, who crumples. Brendan asks him to go with him for a drink (the same tactic he had employed with Leo). Thus, Brendan starts dating; Leo's brother Adam and Angie get together; Jeremy and Darren make up; and Leo sleeps with Sally.

Cast
Kevin McKidd as Leo
Julie Graham as Angie
Simon Callow as Keith
Con O'Neill as Terry
Harriet Walter as Sybil
Christopher Fulford as Adam
James Purefoy as Brendan
Jennifer Ehle as Sally
Tom Hollander as Darren
Hugo Weaving as Jeremy
Paul Higgins as John

The film is notable for bringing together a number of actors on the cusp of breaking out into high-profile careers. McKidd became a leading man in films such as Topsy-Turvy, Anna Karenina (2000) on PBS, Nicholas Nickleby, De-Lovely, HBO's mini-series, Rome, and ABC's Grey's Anatomy. Purefoy, too, received starring roles in Mansfield Park (1999), Resident Evil (2002), Vanity Fair (2004) and as Marc Antony in Rome.  Tom Hollander broke through in 2001 in Gosford Park, followed by nominated performances in Cambridge Spies, The Libertine, and Pride & Prejudice. He is probably best known, however, for portraying the villainous Cutler Beckett in Pirates of the Caribbean: Dead Man's Chest and Pirates of the Caribbean: At World's End.

Hugo Weaving had already become well known after his role in The Adventures of Priscilla, Queen of the Desert in 1994 and Babe in 1995 (as Rex the Sheepdog). The year after Bedrooms and Hallways debuted, he became even better known through significant roles in The Matrix film and The Lord of the Rings film trilogy, some of the top-grossing film series of all time.

Reception
On review aggregator website Rotten Tomatoes the film has a score of 69% based on reviews from 13 critics, with an average rating of 6.3/10.

Marjorie Baumgarten of The Austin Chronicle awarded film with 3 stars out of 5, while Bob Graham of the San Francisco Chronicle gave it 3 out of 4.

See also
Queer Cinema

References

External links

Project Bedroom

1998 comedy-drama films
1998 LGBT-related films
British comedy-drama films
British LGBT-related films
Gay-related films
Male bisexuality in film
LGBT-related comedy-drama films
1990s English-language films
1990s British films